Tama: Adventurous Ball in Giddy Labyrinth is a video game developed and published under Tengen's new name: Time Warner Interactive for the Sega Saturn and Sony PlayStation in 1994.  Tama was also a launch title for both consoles.

Gameplay
Tama is a game in which the player rolls a ball through a maze by moving the terrain.

Reception
Next Generation reviewed the game, rating it two stars out of five, and stated that "Unlikely to star big in Saturn's US line-up. And this is probably a Good Thing."

Next Generation reviewed the game, rating it three stars out of five, and stated that "On one hand it's encouraging to see the Saturn handling the demands of this game as nicely as it does, but in the end its power would be better applied elsewhere."

Reviews
Mean Machines - Feb, 1995
Computer and Video Games (Feb, 1995)

Notes

References

External links 
 Tama: Adventurous Ball in Giddy Labyrinth at GameFAQs
 Tama: Adventurous Ball in Giddy Labyrinth at Giant Bomb
 Tama: Adventurous Ball in Giddy Labyrinth at MobyGames

1994 video games
Japan-exclusive video games
Marble games
Platform games
PlayStation (console) games
Racing video games
Sega Saturn games
Time Warner Interactive games
Video games developed in Japan